Alarm Clock is an album by the folk rock musician Richie Havens. It was released in 1971 by Stormy Forest. It is his highest charting album, reaching number 29 on the Billboard Top 200 in the United States. The opening track, a live cover of the Beatles' "Here Comes the Sun", reached number 16.

Track listing
Except where otherwise noted, all tracks composed by Richie Havens and Mark Roth. Note that running times are listed from the original LP, and may vary slightly for other formats.
"Here Comes the Sun" (George Harrison) - 3:43
"To Give All Your Love Away" – 2:58
"Younger Men Grow Older" - 4:05
"Girls Don't Run Away" (Richie Havens) - 4:17
"End of the Seasons" (Richie Havens, Mark Roth, Bob Margouleff) - 3:38
"Some Will Wait" - 2:40
"Patient Lady" - 4:45
"Missing Train" - 4:55
"Alarm Clock" - 7:17

Personnel
Richie Havens - vocals (1-9), guitar (1-9), percussion (6-8), piano (9)
Paul Williams - lead guitar (1-9), second lead guitar (9)
Eric Oxendine - bass (1,2,4,6-9)
Joe Price - conga drums (1)
Bill Keith - steel guitar (1)
Rick Derringer - electric guitar (2)
Daniel Ben Zebulon - conga drums (2,4,6-9)
Alan Hand - piano (2,4)
Bill LaVorgna - drums (3,4)
Dennis Persich - electric guitar (7)
Buzz Linhardt - vibes (8)
Warren Bernhardt - organ (8)
Bill Shepherd - string arrangement (5)

References 

Richie Havens albums
1971 albums